Larry Santos (born June 2, 1941, in Oneonta, New York) is an American pop music singer-songwriter. Santos wrote songs for several American pop bands in the 1960s, including the 1963 hit "Candy Girl" for The Four Seasons which reached number 3 on Billboard Hot 100 chart. In the mid-Sixties, he recorded singles as part of a group called The Madisons, and then under his own name. He released three albums in the 1970s and scored one pop hit single, produced by Don Davis, "We Can't Hide it Anymore", which peaked on April 10, 1976, at number 36 on the Billboard Hot 100.

From 1976 to 1980 Santos starred in the television show Hot Fudge, a syndicated children's puppet show broadcast from Detroit, Michigan. Santos scored the program's theme music and other songs, and appeared regularly as a live character actor. He and lead puppet Seymour would perform a duet at the piano at the end of each episode.

Additionally, Santos built a successful career writing and singing advertising jingles. Santos's songs have appeared in television commercials for Pan Am, Admiral, Chevrolet, Marathon Oil, and Budweiser among others.

Santos' baritone singing voice has been described as "gruff, but warm" and said to bear a very strong resemblance to the voice of Richie Havens. His music is considered in the genre of blue-eyed soul.

Discography 
Just a Man (Evolution 2002), 1969
Mornin' Sun  (Evolution 2015), 1969
Legacy (Warlock 2000), 1973
Larry Santos (Casablanca Records 7018), 1975
You Are Everything I Need (Casablanca 7030), 1976
Don't Let the Music Stop (Casablanca 7061), 1977
Interplay (Overture Records 1201), 1980
Viva Arriva (Live) (Overture Records), 1996

References

External links
[ Larry Santos] at Allmusic.

1941 births
Living people
American male pop singers
American rhythm and blues singer-songwriters
American soul singers
People from Oneonta, New York
Singer-songwriters from New York (state)
Casablanca Records artists
American male singer-songwriters